Tanner Swanson is an American professional baseball coach. He is the major league quality control coach and catching coordinator for the New York Yankees of Major League Baseball (MLB). He previously served as the Minor and Major League Catching Coordinator for the Minnesota Twins.

Career
Swanson attended Cle Elum-Roslyn High School in Cle Elum, Washington. He played four years of college baseball. He spent his freshman season at Green River College, sophomore season at Everett Community College, and his final two seasons at Central Washington University. He graduated from Central Washington with a Bachelor of Science in Physical Education and School Health.

Swanson spent 2007 and 2008 as a health education teacher and baseball coach at Sultan Senior High School. He was an assistant coach for Everett Community College in 2009. Swanson spent 2010 as an assistant coach, and as a lecturer in the School of Physical Education and School Health at Central Washington University. He then spent the 2011 season as the head baseball coach for Green River College. Swanson spent 2012 through July 2017 at the University of Washington. He was a graduate manager in 2011-2012, director of baseball operations for part of 2012, and then volunteer assistant coach for the remainder of his time there. Swanson also founded D1 Catching, an independent catching coaching and consultation business in 2015. He was hired as a full-time assistant coach at Santa Clara University in July 2017. Swanson entered professional baseball when he was hired by the Minnesota Twins as their minor league catching coordinator in November 2017.

In November 2019, Swanson was hired by the New York Yankees to serve as their major league quality control coach and catching coordinator.

References

External links

Washington Huskies bio
Santa Clara Broncos

Living people
Baseball coaches from Washington (state)
Central Washington University faculty
Central Washington Wildcats baseball coaches
Central Washington Wildcats baseball players
Everett Trojans baseball coaches
Everett Trojans baseball players
Green River Gators baseball coaches
Green River Gators baseball players
Minor league baseball coaches
New York Yankees coaches
People from Roslyn, Washington
Santa Clara Broncos baseball coaches
Seattle University alumni
Washington Huskies baseball coaches
Year of birth missing (living people)